British Railways' 11104 was a 'Planet' Type 4w diesel-mechanical shunting locomotive built by F. C. Hibberd & Co Ltd in 1950. It was acquired by British Railways and given the running number 11104, but was later transferred to departmental use at the West Hartlepool Permanent Way Depot in 1953 and following this was renumbered 52. In 1965, it was transferred to the Southern Region of British Railways where it remained until it was withdrawn in March 1967. It was later scrapped by John Cashmore Ltd in Newport.

It used an 0-4-0DM/4wDM wheel configuration and was powered by an English National Type DA4 4-cylinder engine producing 52 hp (39 kW). This engine drove a 3-speed mechanical spur-type gearbox which drove the wheels via a roller chain final drive. The final power output at rail was 39 hp (29 kW).

References

 11004
B locomotives
Individual locomotives of Great Britain
Railway locomotives introduced in 1950
Standard gauge locomotives of Great Britain
Scrapped locomotives